East Hempfield Township is a township in west-central Lancaster County, Pennsylvania, United States. At the 2020 census the population was 26,350.

East Hempfield is one of the six immediate suburbs of the city of Lancaster, all sharing the same official designation as Lancaster, Pennsylvania by the United States Postal Service.

History
The Landis Mill Covered Bridge, Shenk's Mill Covered Bridge, Christian Habeck Farm, and Samuel N. Mumma Tobacco Warehouse are listed on the National Register of Historic Places.

Geography
It includes the unincorporated communities of Mechanicsville, Landisville, Bamford, Centerville, Chestnut Ridge, Rohrerstown, Donerville, Chestnut View, and Wheatland, as well as part of Salunga.

Demographics

As of the census of 2000, there were 21,399 people, 8,552 households, and 6,054 families residing in the township. The population density was 1,011.6 people per square mile (390.6/km). There were 8,761 housing units at an average density of 414.2/sq mi (159.9/km). The racial makeup of the township was 93.45% White, 1.51% Black or African American, 0.11% Native American, 2.56% Asian, 1.51% from other races, and 0.86% from two or more races. 2.78% of the population were Hispanic or Latino of any race.

There were 8,552 households, out of which 30.9% had children under the age of 18 living with them, 62.0% were married couples living together, 6.3% had a female householder with no husband present, and 29.2% were non-families. 24.1% of all households were made up of individuals, and 9.5% had someone living alone who was 65 years of age or older. The average household size was 2.47 and the average family size was 2.96.

In the township the population was spread out, with 23.9% under the age of 18, 6.7% from 18 to 24, 27.4% from 25 to 44, 26.7% from 45 to 64, and 15.4% who were 65 years of age or older. The median age was 41 years. For every 100 females, there were 96.2 males. For every 100 females age 18 and over, there were 93.6 males.

The median income for a household in the township was $54,431, and the median income for a family was $68,965. Males had a median income of $43,958 versus $29,496 for females. The per capita income for the township was $28,192. About 1.8% of families and 3.9% of the population were below the poverty line, including 4.1% of those under age 18 and 5.1% of those age 65 or over.

Points of interest
 Amos Herr House & Park, donated by Amos Herr upon his death, contains an old farmhouse built in 1852, adjoining barns and the East Hempfield Township municipal building.
 Dutch Apple Dinner Theatre, a professional dinner theater.

Notable people
Melissa Minnich Coleman, architect

Local businesses
 Kellogg's
 Y&S Candies

References

External links

 
 Hempfield School District
 Dutch Apple Dinner Theatre

Populated places established in 1717
Townships in Lancaster County, Pennsylvania
Townships in Pennsylvania
1717 establishments in Pennsylvania